Scott Pratt is an American physicist.

After completing a bachelor's of science degree in physics at the University of Kansas in 1980, Pratt pursued a doctorate in the subject at the University of Minnesota, which he earned in 1985. He began working at Michigan State University's National Superconducting Cyclotron Laboratory in 1992. Pratt was elected a fellow of the American Physical Society in 2011, "[f]or seminal contributions to the theory of pion interferometry and the phenomenology of heavy ion collisions."

References

Year of birth missing (living people)
Living people
20th-century American physicists
21st-century American physicists
Michigan State University faculty
American nuclear physicists
University of Minnesota alumni
University of Kansas alumni
Fellows of the American Physical Society